CLE or Cle may refer to:

Places

United States
 Cleveland, Ohio
 Cleveland Indians
 Cleveland Browns
 Cleveland Cavaliers

Science and technology
 Chemical Langevin equation, a stochastic ordinary differential equation
 Conformal loop ensemble, a conformally invariant collection of fractal loops which models interfaces in two-dimensional statistical physics
 Chu–Liu/Edmonds algorithm, an algorithm for finding optimal branchings in graph theory
 Current-limiting element, a fuse designed to limit current in power systems

Medicine

 Congenital lobar emphysema
 Continuous lumbar epidural infusion, a common type of epidural anesthesia
 Leukoencephalopathy with vanishing white matter

Organizations
 Cleveland Weather Forecast Office, of the U.S. National Weather Service
 Central Landing Establishment, 
 Claire's (stock symbol), a retailer of accessories, jewelry, and toys
 Council of Leather Exports, India

People
People with the name Cle (or Clé) include:
 Clé Bennett, Canadian television, film, and stage actor
 Cle Jeltes (1924–2010), Dutch sailor and Olympic measurer
 Cle Newhook (1943–2018), Canadian theologian, author and politician
 Cle Shaheed Sloan (born 1969), American activist, actor and documentary director

Transport
 Clementi MRT station (MRT station abbreviation)
 Cleveland Hopkins International Airport (IATA airport code)

Other uses
 Canadian Lakehead Exhibition, in Thunder Bay, Ontario, Canada
 Continuing legal education, the professional education of lawyers that takes place after their initial admission to the bar
 Clé, a collection of albums by South Korean boy band Stray Kids